Kadavul Irukaan Kumaru is a 2016 Indian Tamil-language romantic comedy film written and directed by M. Rajesh and produced by N. Ramasamy. The film stars G. V. Prakash Kumar, Nikki Galrani and Anandhi, while Prakash Raj and RJ Balaji play supporting roles. The film began during March 2016. The movie released on 18 November 2016 and received negative reviews from critics. The film was dubbed and released in Telugu as Chennai Chinnodu in 2018.

Plot 
Kumar is to get married in a couple of days, with his fiancé Priya. But Kumar wants to spend a day with his friends at Pondicherry celebrating his bachelor party. After a night of partying by the beach, Kumar and his friend Balaji attempt to return to Chennai the next morning, only to get caught on route by three corrupt policemen: Manimaaran, Mayilsamy, and Madaswamy. They find a huge stock of alcohol in the trunk of their car and refuse to let them go. With no money to pay the bribe, Kumar and Balaji try to escape in their car. However, they are chased down, threatened, and given an ultimatum.

Cast 

G. V. Prakash Kumar as Kumar
Nikki Galrani as Priya
Anandhi as Nancy 
Prakash Raj as ACP Manimaaran
RJ Balaji as Balaji
Rajendran as  Father Francis Rajendran
Robo Shankar as Mayilswamy
Singampuli as Madaswamy
Urvashi as Gomathi Gopalakrishnan
Kovai Sarala as Shanti
T. Siva as Kumar's father
Uday Mahesh as Priya's father
Sachu as Kumar's grandmother
Shanmugasundaram as Kumar's grandfather
Aishwarya as Manimaaran's wife
Manobala as "Pesuvadhellam Unmai" show director
M. S. Bhaskar as Michael Aasirvadham
Santhana Bharathi as Church Priest
Arjunan
Jiiva as Karthik Kumar (cameo appearance)
Mandy Takhar in a special appearance
Gana Bala in a special appearance

Production 
Director M. Rajesh and actor-composer G. V. Prakash Kumar announced that they would collaborate for a new comedy film during early November 2015, after the director had been impressed with the actor's performance in Trisha Illana Nayanthara (2015). Titled Kadavul Irukaan Kumaru after a dialogue from Selvaraghavan's Pudhupettai (2006), Rajesh signed on actresses Nikki Galrani and Avika Gor to play the film's leading female roles after Priya Anand and Keerthy Suresh were linked to the project. T. Siva agreed to produce the film while also acted in the film portraying Prakash's father, while actors RJ Balaji and Prakash Raj joined the cast of the film in early 2016.

Production began for the film at Sathyam Cinemas during early March 2016, before the team shifted to film scenes in Pondicherry. G. V. Prakash Kumar and RJ Balaji suffered injuries following a car accident during the making of the film in late March 2016. In May 2016, Rajesh chose to replace Avika Gor with Anandhi, after the actress had difficulties filming scenes in the Tamil language.

Reception 
The critic from The Hindu wrote it is "Rajesh’s seventh film and it’s amusing to see how little his cinema has evolved", while Rediff.com's critic stated that "Kadavul Irukaan Kumaru is a waste of time" and that the film "was plain annoying". Likewise, Behindwoods.com wrote "on the whole, Rajesh has followed his signature template, which looks very much usual and ordinary" and the critics from the New Indian Express suggested "if you decide to sit this one out, don’t worry you are not missing out on a lot". In contrast, a reviewer from Sify.com noted "To conclude, Kadavul Irukaan Kumaru is a  watchable comedy entertainer and it might entertain if you don't worry much about logical loopholes and some blatant comedy sequences".

Soundtrack 
The music is composed by G. V. Prakash Kumar, with lyrics for four songs written by Na. Muthukumar. An extra song in the album Locality Boys was released earlier than the soundtrack as a single, and features music composed by Bobo Shashi and Karunas and lyrics written by Dharran and Karunas.

References

External links 
 

2016 films
2010s Tamil-language films
2016 romantic comedy films
Indian romantic comedy films
Films scored by G. V. Prakash Kumar
Films directed by M. Rajesh